Kiwi.com (previously known as skypicker.com) is a Czech online travel agency founded by Oliver Dlouhý and Jozef Képesi in 2012. Kiwi.com provides a fare aggregator, metasearch engine and booking for airline tickets and ground transportation. Its ticket search features Kiwi.com’s "virtual interlining" concept – itineraries combined from over 750 carriers, including many that do not usually cooperate in online bookings.

Background 
The online portal skypicker.com was created in 2011. The company was founded in Brno by Oliver Dlouhý and Jozef Képesi. In 2016 the company acquired the domain name Kiwi.com for $800,000 and rebranded itself as Kiwi.com. Jiří Hlavenka was one of its first investors. In 2017, Kiwi.com acquired a stake in Jaroslav Kokolus.

As of June 2019, Kiwi.com’s main shareholder is General Atlantic. Dlouhý and Képesi remain as major shareholders and continue to run the company. Other shareholders are Touzimsky Airlines and Luboš Charčenko.

Services 
In 2018 Kiwi.com launched NOMAD, a special multi-city travel search tool, and Tequila, a dedicated B2B platform.

Along with its headquarters in Brno, Kiwi.com has offices in Belgrade (Serbia), Kyiv (Ukraine), Split (Croatia), and Fiji.

The company is presently one of the five biggest online air ticket sellers in Europe, with an annual turnover of approximately 1.1 billion euros in 2018. The company booked around 12,000 traveler itineraries daily and employed 2000 workers during 2019.

Controversies 
Throughout the COVID-19 pandemic, Kiwi has been criticized for its refund policies and its customer service practices.

According to a company spokesman, Kiwi.com does not account for COVID-19 restrictions when creating travel itineraries. This has led to customers being charged thousands of dollars for flights that individuals could not legally take in light of COVID-19 travel restrictions. The company has put up barriers to refunds for individuals who have been issued legally impossible travel arrangements after booking with the site; one couple who had been issued impossible travel arrangements was only provided a refund after Kiwi.com was contacted by a New Zealand-based news website regarding their refund practices. 

Kiwi.com also offered refunds of only 10 euros to travellers who cancelled previously booked trips that had cost travellers thousands of dollars, drawing criticism. Kiwi responded to criticism by blaming airlines for not processing refunds quickly enough. Ryanair, an Irish low-cost airline, has stated that Kiwi.com has refused to provide it with the credit card or other payment information of travelers that the airline would require in order to issue refunds directly to those whose flights have been canceled.

The Observer identified Kiwi.com as one of the companies responsible for the year's "worst customer service" after it began charging customers an additional fee for "standard" customer service, with customers who do not pay the fee having to wait longer for phone support and having no access to email support. The Better Business Bureau has given Kiwi.com an "F" rating.

On 14 January 2021, Southwest Airlines sued Kiwi.com, alleging that its scraping of fare information from Southwest's website was a breach of contract and that Kiwi.com's use of Southwest's logo in its search results constituted trademark infringement. In response, Kiwi.com removed Southwest's logo from its search results, but continued to sell Southwest tickets despite Southwest sending Kiwi.com a series of cease-and-desist demands. In December 2021, a Texas court ruled in favor of Southwest permanently banning Kiwi.com from scraping and harvesting information from Southwest’s website, republishing the airline’s schedules, and selling Southwest tickets without permission.

On 18 August 2021, Ryanair announced that it would no longer allow passengers who booked with Kiwi.com to board flights with Kiwi.com-issued boarding passes, stating that it could not ensure that passengers had been informed of prohibited objects when Kiwi.com completes the check-in process. In their defense, Kiwi.com stated that their own boarding passes contain all of the information that Ryanair would offer on their boarding passes, with a representative stating that, “all the information is the same, just the colours are different.” Later, on 27 August, following a lawsuit by Ryanair, the Constitutional Court of the Czech Republic ruled in favor of Kiwi.com, stating that Kiwi.com had the right to conduct business after overturning an earlier ruling by a regional court which had instructed Kiwi.com to adjust information according to Ryanair’s terms and conditions, and to share customers’ correct contact information as well as their payment details.

See also 

 Booking.com
 Super.com
 Kayak
 Skyscanner

External links 

 Kiwi.com (Facebook page)

References 

Metasearch engines
Companies based in Brno
Travel ticket search engines
Internet properties established in 2012
Czech companies established in 2012